d’bi.young anitafrika is a Jamaican-Canadian feminist dub poet and activist. Their work includes theatrical performances, four published collections of poetry, twelve plays, and seven albums.

Early life and education 
d’bi young anitafrika was born on December 23, 1977, in Kingston, Jamaica to dub poet, Anita Stewart, and community organizer, Winston Young. Young spent much of their childhood in Jamaica watching their mother perform dub poetry. In 1993, they moved to Toronto, Canada, to join their parents where they completed high school.

Career 
Young's early career included the role of “Crystal” on the Frances-Anne Solomon produced sitcom Lord Have Mercy! (2003), theatre work with Black Theatre Workshop and Theatre Passe Muraille, and artist residencies with Soulpepper Theatre, CanadianStage, Obsidian Theatre, and Banff Centre for the Arts. In 2001, their breakout role as “Stacyanne” came through Da Kink in My Hair, by Jamaican-Canadian writer Trey Anthony, for which they were nominated for a Dora Award. Badilisha Poetry X-Change has ranked d'bi young anitafrika in the top ten poets.

Young's early poetry, including their first dub poem entitled "once dere was a mxn" written in 1988, followed the foundational aesthetic of dub poetry's form, style, and content. In 2013, Young was one of the headline names for the 2013 Human Rights Concert in Harare, Zimbabwe. There, they collaborated with Zimbabwean musician Victor Kunonga on a song called Ruvengo (Hate) off Kunonga's album Kwedu.

Key works 
Young's works, The Sankofa Trilogy, The Orisha Trilogy and The Ibeji Trilogy, explore the psychological and ideological impacts of colonization to capitalism on people of African descent, from a Black Feminist perspective. They are triptych dramas.

The Sankofa Trilogy are the stories of three Jamaican women, Mudgu Sankofa, their daughter Sekesu, and their granddaughter Benu. Each play uses the women's familial bond to tell of their respective journeys of revolutionary self-determination, and transformative self-expression. The Orisha Trilogy is a series about the experiences of women characters of the past, present, and future who survived the transatlantic slave trade. In each time period, the women grapple with power, gender, and sexuality through oppression and social unrest, under the help and protection of the Orishas. The Ibeji Trilogy are three biomyth dramas about Black love as it evolves in the midst of major life changes, from friendship to romance, between mother and son, and deep self-love.

Publishing and theatre
Young established the micro-press Spolrusie Publishing, a publishing house to support the work of emerging black writers, and BQTIPOC and feminist works.

From 2008-2018 they also created and ran The Watah Theatre, the only black-focused performance art school in Canada. The Watah Theatre offered tuition-free professional development programs. Between The Watah Theatre and Yemoya Artist Residency, they mentored some of Canada's up and coming young black creatives and international artists of colour including Amanda Parris, Kim Katrin Milan, Titilope Sonuga, and photographer, Che Kothari.

Young's style of theatre practice developed draws from their upbringing in the performative and political environment of emerging Dub poetry in Jamaica of 1980s. They use Jamaican language and idiom as nation language, as opposed to colloquialism. They work extensively with monodrama and biomythography, or “biomyth monodrama.”

They appeared on the 2021 FreeUp! The Emancipation Day Special.

The Anitafrika Method 

Young's work recognizes the connections between identity and community as both inextricable and sacred. The Anitafrika Method initiates self-recovery through a creative process of performance that grounds broader notions of identity, community, social constructs, and metaphysical concepts, and focuses them into an embodied performance experience. The Anitafrika Method stems from the Dub theory of their mother, Anita Stewart. They have applied the method in a variety of disciplines and with practitioners in health care, social justice, art, and leadership development.

From January to June 2015, Young applied the method in a special collaboration with the Women's College Hospital in Toronto, Ontario, Canada: The Black Womxn's Health Research Project.

In 2018 Young began work in postgraduate studies in the Praxes, Politics and Pedagogies of Black Performance at Goldsmiths, University of London.

Selected works

Plays

Theatre (actor)

Television (actor)

Compilations

Books

Essays

Poetry

Notes

References

Further reading 
Allen, L 2016, ‘The Sixth Sense in Performance: d’bi.young anitafrika’, in J Householder & T Mars (Eds), More Caught in The Act: An Anthology of Performance Art by Canadian Women, YYZ Books, Toronto, pp. 107–113.
Austin, D 2018, Dread Poetry and Freedom: Linton Kwesi Johnson and the Unfinished Revolution, Pluto Books, Montreal.
Flynn, K & Marrast, E 2008, ‘Dubbin Revolushun: Interview with d’bi.young’, obsidian lll, vol. 5, no. 2, pp. 35–58.
Luhning, H 2010, ‘Accountability, Integrity, and 'Benu': an Interview with d'bi.young’, Alt Theatre Magazine, vol. 8, no.1, pp. 10–17.
Gumbs, A P 2016, ‘Angel’s Basic School: d’bi.young anitafrika and Black Queer Divinity’, Jacket2, 6 October
Ford Smith, H 2018, ‘Performing Queer Marronage: The Work of d’bi.young anitafrika’, in P Dickinson, C E Gatchalian, K Oliver & D Singh (Eds), Q2Q: Queer Canadian Performance Texts, Playwrights Canada Press, Toronto, pp. 239–243.
Gill, L K 2016, ‘I Represent Freedom: Diaspora and The Meta-Queerness of Dub Theater’, in E P Johnson (Ed), No Tea, No Shade: New Writings in Black Queer Studies, Duke University Press, durham, pp. 113–130.
Sakolsky, R 2004, ‘Summer Festivals 2004: International Dub Poetry Festival’, The Beat, vol. 23, no. 5, pp. 36–37, 41.

External links
d'bi.young anitafrika, official website

Living people
21st-century Canadian poets
Canadian women dramatists and playwrights
Canadian reggae musicians
Canadian television actresses
Black Canadian writers
Black Canadian actresses
Black Canadian musicians
Canadian women poets
Dora Mavor Moore Award winners
Jamaican emigrants to Canada
Jamaican dub poets
Canadian LGBT musicians
Canadian stage actresses
Canadian LGBT dramatists and playwrights
Canadian LGBT poets
21st-century Canadian dramatists and playwrights
21st-century Canadian women writers
Black Canadian LGBT people
1977 births
21st-century Canadian LGBT people
Queer poets
Queer dramatists and playwrights